Elachista fuscofrontella is type a moth of the family Elachistidae. It is found in Estonia, Latvia, and Russian Far East.

The ground colour of the forewings is dark grey, strongly mottled with black tipped scales. The hindwings are brown. Adults have been recorded in August.

References

fuscofrontella
Moths described in 1990
Moths of Europe
Moths of Asia